"Living" is a song co-written and recorded by American country music singer Dierks Bentley. It was released in February 2019 as the third single from Bentley's 2018 album The Mountain. Bentley co-wrote the song with Ross Copperman, Ashley Gorley, and Jon Nite.

Commercial performance
Living reached No. 1 on Billboards Country Airplay dated September 28, 2019, which is Bentley's 17th No. 1 on the chart. The song has sold 79,000 copies in the United States as of October 2019.

Music video
The official video of the song, directed by Wes Edwards, features Bentley and his son Knox spending quality time together by playing in their backyard, as well as various other places such as a water park, a go-kart track, and a laser tag arena.

Charts

Weekly charts

Year-end charts

Certifications

References

2019 singles
2018 songs
Dierks Bentley songs
Songs written by Dierks Bentley
Songs written by Ashley Gorley
Songs written by Ross Copperman
Song recordings produced by Ross Copperman
Capitol Records Nashville singles
Songs written by Jon Nite